The Simuay River is a river in the Philippines with its source at Lanao del Sur in the Piapayungan range, and its mouth at is at Illana Bay through the Mindanao River.

Rivers of the Philippines